Bell v. the State of Georgia, 227 Ga. 800, 183 S.E.2d 357 (1971) is one of several cases in which the Supreme Court of Georgia set forth the standard by which an extraordinary motion for a new trial is to be judged.

In order for a defendant to succeed when making such a motion after having discovered new evidence, the defendant must show

  These six criteria have appeared in a number of other decisions of the Georgia Supreme Court, including Timberlake v. the State and the majority opinion in Davis v. the State (see Troy Anthony Davis).

The case stemmed from an appeal for a conviction centered on child hearsay testimony. This court decision and similar ones in the same and other U.S. states are designed to ensure the finality of jury verdicts.  It is therefore necessary for defense lawyers to present all exculpatory evidence at trial rather than bringing such evidence before the courts in a piecemeal manner; however, some have criticized the principle of finality of jury verdicts as increasing the possibility of errors in death penalty cases.

Sources 

Georgia (U.S. state) case law
U.S. state criminal procedure case law
1971 in United States case law
1971 in Georgia (U.S. state)
United States hearsay case law